The Nawara Development Project is a gas development project in Tunisia.

History

In 2003, the exploration permit Jenein Sud (located in the south of Tataouine governorate) was granted to ETAP and OMV. The permit stated that the costs of research, including the drilling of exploratory wells, would be made at the expense and risk of OMV.

In January 2006, the group made the Nawara gas/condensate discovery. Drilling campaigns in 2008 and 2010 resulted in eight further successful wells. The concession was granted equally to ETAP and OMV by the Ministry of Industry in 2010.

To transport the future gas/condensate the Nawara Development Project was launched in 2008 by ETAP, OMV, Eni (exited at the end of 2012) and Pioneer (OMV bought its Tunisian assets in January 2011). The project includes a Central Processing Facility at the well site and a 370 km pipeline from Nawara to Gabes where a Gas Treatment Plant was to be installed. In April 2012, the Tunisian Government unilaterally changed the location of the facilities and pipeline route to include Tataouine. As the altered routing would have made the project uneconomic, the Government agreed to revert to the original route with the plant in Gabes in February 2013.

In March 2014, the Government announced that it would build a spur line to Tataouine city to satisfy local gas demand, as well as a gas treatment plant with a capacity of 600,000 m3/d and an LPG bottling unit to create new job opportunities.

Objectives

 Bring 16 billion Sm3 of gas sales to the Tunisian market - roughly 11% of Tunisia’s estimated gas consumption. 
 Produce and sell additional 13.5 MN bbl. condensate and 10.5 MN boe Liquefied Petroleum Gas (LPG). 
 Provide plateau production of 18,000 boe/d over a period of 13 years, with a peak at around 21,500 boe/d during early  years. The first phase of the development is underway. A second drilling phase is set to follow after production start in Q 4 2016.

Benefits

Jobs: Construction work will last two to three years, creating 1,000 plus temporary jobs. The Nawara Development Project will create roughly 200 permanent jobs for skilled and unskilled labor. 
Revenues: The financial impact to the Tunisian budget will be substantial, from gas revenues and taxes. 
Economic growth: Tunisia will reduce its dependency on energy imports and increase its GDP. The main gas pipeline can move up to 10 MN Sm3/d, enabling future additional gas production.

Concept

The four components are:

Central Processing Facilities (CPF) at Nawara site (construction August 2014 – October 2016)
Gas Pipeline (24’’, 370 km) from Nawara to Gabes (construction July 2014 – October 2016 )
Gas Treatment Plant (GTP) at Gabes to produce LPG products and commercial gas (construction September 2014 – October 2016
Additional government investment for the region: a gas spurline from Kamour to Tataouine, a treatment unit with a capacity of 600.000 m3/d of natural gas and an LPG bottling unit, project owned and financed by ETAP .

Status

OMV Final Investment Decision in March 2014 
European Investment Bank co-financing was signed in March 2014, granting a loan of EUR 150 mn to ETAP.
EPCC Contracts  : Pipeline / CPF/ GTP
The recommendation for international tender for the Engineering Procurement Construction & Commissioning Contracts for the three work packs (CPF, pipeline, GTP) is completed.
Contracts signed 18/ 08/2014.
EPCC contractors started Engineering works: Feed endorsement certificates provided.  
ROW Pipeline
State Land: Received approval to proceed with Pipeline construction starting from Nawara to Kamour through Tataouine (approx. 200 km), this will last approx. 10 months construction on site: end of 2015
Private Land in Gabes: 18 km out of a total of 28 km cleared
Collective Land: negotiation in progress
GTP Land Acquisition
Agreement with ETAP & Local Authorities at Gabes to compensate local farmers
Fencing & site grading, 100% complete. GTP land handed over to GTP EPCC contractor. 
Airstrip:  
Technical Evaluation of tenders under finalization
Commercial evaluation of tenders ongoing  
Line Pipe Production  
Line Pipe Procurement Contract was awarded  to Corinth; fabrication 100% complete; delivery to Tunisia 35% completed
Line pipe Valves 
Line Valves Procurement Contract awarded to British LFF 
Signed main commercial agreements in March 2014 (STEG, STIR, TRAPSA)

References

External links

OMV Tunisia Nawara project official page (French)
OMV to invest €500 million in Nawara gas field

2008 establishments in Tunisia
Fossil fuels in Tunisia